Parategeticula ecdysiastica is a moth of the family Prodoxidae. It is found in the Sierra de la Laguna Mountains of the Cape region of Baja California, Mexico

The wingspan is about 25 mm. The forewings are tannish white, with a very light scattering of linear white scales. The hindwings are clear-translucent, with very scattered white linear scales above and below. Adults are possibly on wing in July.

The larvae feed on Yucca capensis. Young larvae feed inside gall-like tissue modified from three seeds. Full-grown larvae prepare exit paths to the fruit surface, and have been observed consuming five developed seeds adjacent to the site of the consumed, modified tissue.

Etymology
The species epithet is derived from Greek ecdysiast (meaning one who sheds layers) and refers to the near complete loss of all wing scales during adult emergence.

References

Moths described in 2008
Prodoxidae